This is the results breakdown of the local elections held in Asturias on 27 May 2007. The following tables show detailed results in the autonomous community's most populous municipalities, sorted alphabetically.

Overall

City control
The following table lists party control in the most populous municipalities, including provincial capitals (shown in bold). Gains for a party are displayed with the cell's background shaded in that party's colour.

Municipalities

Avilés
Population: 83,538

Gijón
Population: 274,472

Langreo
Population: 46,076

Mieres
Population: 45,645

Oviedo
Population: 214,883

San Martín del Rey Aurelio
Population: 19,430

Siero
Population: 49,376

See also
2007 Asturian regional election

References

Asturias
2007